Agelaea fulva is a species of ground beetle from the Platyninae subfamily that is endemic to Sardinia.

References

Beetles described in 1839
Endemic arthropods of Sardinia
Beetles of Europe